Arena Point (previously known as Tower North Central and Tower House) is a  high office tower in Leeds, England. It is situated at the top end of Leeds city centre on Merrion Way in close proximity to the Merrion Centre and is adjacent to the Opal 3 Tower.

The building was constructed in 1965 and with 19 floors is currently the joint fifth tallest building in Leeds, along with Park Plaza Hotel Leeds. Tower North Central was reclad in 1980, and refurbished in 2003–2004, and now provides  of office space. The building also benefits from extensive on site parking with over 100 covered spaces available. The upper 11 floors are occupied by a variety of tenants following refurbishment whilst the lower seven floors and ground floor were excluded from the scheme as they were let to Axa at the time.

Plans have been lodged with Leeds City Council to demolish the building and build a 43-storey student accommodation block in its place.

See also 
 List of tallest buildings in Leeds

References

External links 
 Official Website
 Article on Skyscraper News
Managing Agent

Buildings and structures in Leeds
Office buildings completed in 1967